Abdi-Riša was a ruler-'mayor' of Enišasi, during the period of the Amarna letters correspondence (1350–1335 BC). Another mayor of Enišasi, Šatiya, is found in the Amarna letters corpus. The name "Abdi-Riša" means "servant-Riša".

Abdi-Riša is only referenced in his own letter EA 363, a letter to pharaoh, (EA for 'el Amarna').

Letter no. 363 is a unique letter, being part of a letter–series, (by the same scribe):
EA 174-(1), "Report on Amqu (1)"
EA 175-(2), "Report on Amqu (2)"
EA 176-(3), "Report on Amqu (3)"
EA 363-(4), "Report on Amqu (4)"

the Amqu being the "Beqaa Valley area" of Lebanon. As letter EA 363 was discovered later, (in a separate in-situ deposit), than the original letters of the Amarna letters correspondence, it is undamaged.

Abdi-Riša letter
EA 363, title: "A joint report on Amqu (4)"
Say to the king-(i.e. Pharaoh), my lord, my god, my Sun: Message of Abdi-Riša, your servant, the ruler of E(ni)šasi. I fall in the dirt under the feet of the king, my lord, 7 times and 7 times. Look, we ar(e) in Amqu, in cities of the king, my lord, and Etakkama, the ruler of Qinsa-(Kadesh), assisted the troops of Hatti and set the cities of the king, my lord, on fire. May the king, my lord, take cognizance, and may the king, my lord, give archers that we may (re)gain the cities of the king, my lord, and dwell in the cities of the king, my lord, my god, my Sun.  -EA 363, lines 1-23 (complete)

The actual written name used for Enišasi in this letter is: Ešasi.

See also
Šatiya
Enišasi
Amarna letters–localities and their rulers

References
Moran, William L. The Amarna Letters. Johns Hopkins University Press, 1987, 1992. (softcover)

14th-century BC Phoenician people
14th-century BC rulers
Amarna letters writers
Phoenicians in the Amarna letters